Banksia armata, commonly known as prickly dryandra, is a species of often sprawling shrub that is endemic to Western Australia. It has deeply serrated leaves with sharply pointed lobes and spikes of about 45 to 70 yellow flowers.

Description

Taxonomy
Specimens of B. armata were first collected at King George Sound in December 1801 by Robert Brown. Brown published a description of the species in 1810 in Transactions of the Linnean Society of London naming it Dryandra armata. The specific epithet is from the Latin armatus meaning "armed", in reference to the sharply serrated leaves. Thirty years later, John Lindley published a purported new species, which he named Dryandra favosa. This was accepted as a species by Carl Meissner in 1845, but declared a taxonomic synonym of D. armata by him in 1856, and the latter view was taken by George Bentham his 1870 Flora Australiensis. In 1996, Alex George published D. a. var. ignicida, resulting in the automatic creation of the autonym D. a. var.armata. George also refined the synonymy of D. favosa to D. armata var. armata. In 2007, all Dryandra species were transferred to Banksia by Austin Mast and Kevin Thiele so that the name D. armata changed to Banksia armata.

The names of the two varieties of this species are accepted by the Australian Plant Census:
 Banksia armata (R.Br.)

Distribution and habitat
The species is widespread throughout most of the south-west. The main distribution is between Perth and Albany, but it also occurs near Mount Lesueur in the north, and between Esperance and Israelite Bay on the south coast. It grows on sandy loam or in rocky soils in tall shrubland or low woodland.

Conservation status
Banksia armata and both varieties are classified as "not threatened" by the Western Australian Government Department of Parks and Wildlife.

References

armata
Plants described in 1810
Endemic flora of Western Australia
Taxa named by Robert Brown (botanist, born 1773)